Robert Franklin Pennell (July 13, 1850 – October 22, 1905) was an American educator and classicist.

Pennell was born on July 13, 1850, in Freeport, Maine to Robert and Caroline Pennell. He graduated from Phillips Exeter Academy in 1868, where his uncle, Gideon Lane Soule, was principal, and from Harvard University in 1871 with a degree in classics. Following his graduation, he became an instructor at Exeter, later teaching Latin. He resigned in 1882, seven years after in 1889 becoming the principal of the Marysville schools in California. From 1890 to 1893 he was president of the Stockton, California schools, and from 1893 to 1897 he was president of Chico State Normal School. He died on October 22, 1905 in San Francisco, California.

Works
Ancient Greece, from the earliest times down to the death of Alexander, 1874
Rome, from the earliest times down to 476 A.D., 1878
The Latin Subjunctive, 1895

References

External links
 
 
 

1850 births
1905 deaths
American classical scholars
California State University, Chico faculty
Heads of universities and colleges in the United States
Harvard University alumni
People from Marysville, California
People from Stockton, California
Phillips Exeter Academy alumni
Phillips Exeter Academy faculty